Jacques Kalaydjian (January 1, 1926, Le Raincy, Paris, France - 15 May 2005) was a French artist of Armenian origin that was creating under the name of Jicka. During 1984-1988 he has been the author of Les Pieds Nickelés - the most popular French comics of the time.

1926 births
2005 deaths
Armenian illustrators
Ethnic Armenian painters
French people of Armenian descent
French cartoonists
French artists